Regidi Amadalavalasa is a village in Srikakulam district of the Indian state of Andhra Pradesh. It is located in Regidi Amadalavalasa mandal of Palakonda revenue division.

References 

Villages in Srikakulam district
Mandal headquarters in Srikakulam district